The Cheap Seats is an Australian weekly news comedy panel television program.

The Cheap Seats may also refer to:

 The Cheap Seats (song), a 1994 single by Alabama
 The Cheap Seats (American TV series), an American baseball television program

Other uses
 "Welcome to the Cheap Seats", a 1991 song by the Wonder Stuff 
 What We Saw from the Cheap Seats, a 2012 studio album by Regina Spektor

See also
 Cheap Seats (disambiguation)